Heddernheim is a quarter of Frankfurt am Main, Germany. It is part of the Ortsbezirk Nord-West and is subdivided into the Stadtbezirke Heddernheim-Ost and Heddernheim-West.

History

Antiquity
The Roman town of Nida (Roman town) was situated in the south-western part of Heddernheim.

There have been three Mithraea (temples to Mithras) discovered at Heddernheim. A hoard of silver votive plaques was discovered in the Roman settlement of Nida near Heddernheim in the nineteenth century, some of which are in the British Museum. The offerings appear to have been deposited in a shrine dedicated to the Roman God of Jupiter Dolichenus.

Middle Ages
Heddernheim was first mentioned in documents in 801 AD as Phetterenheim.

Modern history
In Heddernheim there has been plants for metalworking from the midth 19th century to the 1970s, including a huge plant of Vereinigte Deutsche Metallwerke. Meanwhile a big housing estate was built, named Nordweststadt, including a shopping center called Nordwestzentrum, and Mertonviertel.

During World War II, in 1942, a forced labour camp was established in the district by the Nazis. Due to American advance, in 1945, it was dissolved and its prisoners were deported to the Buchenwald concentration camp.

Subway stations

In Heddernheim there are six stations of the Frankfurt U-Bahn: Heddernheim, Zeilweg, Sandelmühle, Heddernheimer Landstraße, Nordwestzentrum and Römerstadt. They are serving five lines: U1, U2, U3, U8 and U9.

References

Districts of Frankfurt